The 2022 World Aquatics Championships, the 19th edition of the FINA World Aquatics Championships, were held in Budapest, Hungary, from 17 June to 3 July 2022. 

In March 2022, after the Russian invasion of Ukraine, FINA banned both the Russian and Belarusian nationals from entering the championships.

Host selection
Originally, Budapest was selected to host the 2021 World Aquatics Championships. However, after Guadalajara, Mexico, pulled out from the organization of the 2017 Championships, the city took the responsibility for hosting the event, since the infrastructure was already fully ready. Consequently, the application process for the 2021 edition was reopened and the event was relocated to Fukuoka, Japan, and was scheduled to be held between 16 July to August 1, 2021. To avoid clash with the postponed 2020 Summer Olympics the event was rescheduled to be held between 13 to 29 May, 2022. However, in January 2022, it was announced that the event in Fukuoka would be postponed a second time to 14-30 July, 2023 due to the health impacts of the Omicron variant and the  pandemic measures in Japan.  This would have entailed a full four years between World Championships, and only one global event between the 2020 and 2024 Summer Olympics.

On 7 February 2022, FINA announced that Budapest had been awarded to host of an extraordinary out-of sequence Championships to be held from 18 June – 3 July 2022, in order to ensure that athletes had a global aquatics championship to target in the summer of 2022.

It is the second time Budapest hosts the competitions, 5 years after the 2017 World Aquatics Championships and will host again the event in 2027.

Venues
 Duna Aréna (swimming, diving and water polo finals)
 Lake Lupa (open water swimming)
 Tamás Széchy Swimming Complex (artistic swimming)
 Alfréd Hajós National Swimming Stadium (water polo)
 Debrecen Swimming Complex (water polo)
 Szeged Tiszavirág Pool (water polo)
 Sopron Lőver Pool (water polo)

Schedule
A total of 74 medal events were held across five disciplines, one minus than the 2019 Championships. In view of the training and recovery challenges of a busy 2022 aquatics calendar, FINA decided to reverse the calendar, make an event on a smaller scale than previous years with only the compulsory events in its program and choose to drop the high diving and the beach water polo events from program. In addition, there was a reversal in the calendar where swimming and artistic swimming events that is traditionally disputed at the last week were reallocated in the first days and the diving and open waters were reallocated to the second.

Participating nations
Out of 209 FINA members, 185 nations take part in the Championships, as well as the FINA Refugee Team.

Medal table

References

External links
 Official website

 
2022
World Championships, 2022
2022 in Hungarian sport
World Championships, 2022
International sports competitions in Budapest
Sports events postponed due to the COVID-19 pandemic
Sports events affected by the 2022 Russian invasion of Ukraine
June 2022 sports events in Hungary
July 2022 sports events in Hungary